Omali may refer to:

 Om Ali, an Egyptian desert
 Omala, Greece